L.U.C is the alias of Łukasz Rostkowski , a Polish manager, rapper and producer who works in Wrocław. He is the founder, vocalist and co-producer of musical project Kanał Audytywny, and currently works through his solo albums.

Discography

Albums

Collaborative albums

Music videos

References

External links
 Official site

Polish rappers
Living people
1981 births